Robert 'Bob' John Falconer (born 26 December 1962) is a former English cricketer.  Falconer was a right-handed batsman who bowled right-arm off break.  He was born in East Molesey, Surrey.

Falconer represented the Surrey Cricket Board in a single List A cricket match against Cheshire in the 1999 NatWest Trophy.  In his only List A match, he scored 6 runs.

References

External links
Bob Falconer at Cricinfo
Bob Falconer at CricketArchive

1976 births
Living people
People from Molesey
English cricketers
Surrey Cricket Board cricketers